Keyham railway station is a suburban station in the city of Plymouth, Devon, England. The station is close to the Devonport dockyard.

History

The station was opened by the Great Western Railway on 1 June 1900. The goods facilities were used for marshalling trains to and from the Cornwall Railway branch into the naval dockyard, opened on 20 June 1867, which enters the dockyard between the station and Weston Mill viaduct.

The Cornwall Railway was amalgamated into the Great Western Railway on 1 July 1889.

Platform layout 
The entrance is on the down platform, served by trains to Gunnislake and Cornwall. The up platform, reached by a footbridge, is served by trains to Plymouth.

Services
Keyham is served by Tamar Valley Line services from Plymouth to Gunnislake, and by a few trains on the Cornish Main Line to and from Penzance, some of which continue eastwards towards Exeter St Davids.

Community railway
The railway from Plymouth to Gunnislake is designated as the "Tamar Valley Line" community railway and is supported by marketing provided by the Devon and Cornwall Rail Partnership. It is part of the Dartmoor Sunday Rover network of integrated bus and rail routes.

References

Bibliography

Railway stations in Plymouth, Devon
Former Great Western Railway stations
Railway stations in Great Britain opened in 1900
Railway stations served by Great Western Railway
DfT Category F2 stations